The former Vance County Courthouse is a historic courthouse building located at Henderson, Vance County, North Carolina, United States. It was originally built in 1884, before it was extensively remodeled in 1908 by Milburn, Heister & Company in the Neoclassical style. It is a two-story, tan brick, cross-plan building with a monumental front portico supported by brick columns.

It was listed on the National Register of Historic Places in 1979. It is located in the Henderson Central Business Historic District.

References

Frank Pierce Milburn buildings
County courthouses in North Carolina
Courthouses on the National Register of Historic Places in North Carolina
Neoclassical architecture in North Carolina
Government buildings completed in 1908
Buildings and structures in Vance County, North Carolina
National Register of Historic Places in Vance County, North Carolina
1908 establishments in North Carolina
Individually listed contributing properties to historic districts on the National Register in North Carolina